Guillermo García (born 2 January 1944) is a Mexican sailor. He competed in the Flying Dutchman event at the 1968 Summer Olympics.

References

External links
 

1944 births
Living people
Mexican male sailors (sport)
Olympic sailors of Mexico
Sailors at the 1968 Summer Olympics – Flying Dutchman
Sportspeople from Guadalajara, Jalisco